Fredrik Claesson (born 24 November 1992), is a Swedish professional ice hockey defenceman currently playing for HC CSKA Moscow in the Kontinental Hockey League (KHL). He was drafted by the Ottawa Senators in the fifth round (126th overall) of the 2011 NHL draft.

Playing career
Claesson began playing hockey in Haninge HC, and later moved on to Hammarby IF, to play in Hammarby's youth organization. He also made two appearances in the club's senior team in the Swedish second division league HockeyAllsvenskan, during the 2007–08 season. Claesson moved to Stockholm rival Djurgården for the 2008–09, where he played in Djurgården's J18 and J20 teams. He also represented team Stockholm at the 2008 TV-pucken.

Claesson made his Elitserien debut in the Djurgården's first league game of the season on 16 September 2010 against HV71. He signed a two-year extension with Djurgården in October 2010. He scored his first Elitserien goal on 11 December 2010 away against Modo Hockey.

Claesson signed a three-year entry level contract with the Ottawa Senators on 10 May 2012. He began the 2012–13 season with the Senators American Hockey League affiliate, the Binghamton Senators. In June 2015, Claesson re-signed with the Senators on a one-year, two-way contract. Claesson made his NHL debut on 30 December 2015 at Ottawa versus the New Jersey Devils. In July 2016 he was re-signed to a one-year contract with the team and in February 2017 that contract was extended for another year.

After the 2017–18 season, his sixth within the Senators organization, Claesson as an impending restricted free agent was surprisingly not tendered a qualifying offer by the club, and was released to explore free agency on 25 June 2018. He later signed a one-year, $700,000 contract with the New York Rangers on 1 July 2018.

On 17 September 2019, Claesson signed a one-year, two-way deal with the Carolina Hurricanes. He began the 2019–20 season, with the Hurricanes AHL affiliate and reigning champions, the Charlotte Checkers. In 47 games from the blueline with the Checkers, Claesson contributed with 3 goals and 19 points. On 24 February 2020, Claesson was dealt by the Hurricanes at the NHL trade deadline, along with Janne Kuokkanen and a conditional 2020 fourth-round pick to the New Jersey Devils in exchange for Sami Vatanen on 24 February 2020.

On 11 January 2021, Claesson signed a one-year, two-way deal with the San Jose Sharks. He was traded to the Tampa Bay Lightning in exchange for Magnus Chrona on 12 April 2021. He featured in two regular season games with the Lightning, remaining on the roster throughout the post-season as the Lightning retained the Stanley Cup.

Following 10 seasons in North America, Claesson opted to leave as a free agent and was signed to a one-year contract with reigning Russian champions, CSKA Moscow of the KHL, on 13 July 2022.

Career statistics

Regular season and playoffs

International

References

External links

1992 births
Living people
Binghamton Senators players
Charlotte Checkers (2010–) players
HC CSKA Moscow players
Djurgårdens IF Hockey players
Swedish expatriate ice hockey players in Canada
Swedish expatriate ice hockey players in the United States
New Jersey Devils players
New York Rangers players
Ottawa Senators draft picks
Ottawa Senators players
San Jose Sharks players
Ice hockey people from Stockholm
Swedish ice hockey defencemen
Syracuse Crunch players
Tampa Bay Lightning players